Dimensions in Time is a charity special crossover between the British science fiction television series Doctor Who and the soap opera EastEnders. The special was broadcast in two parts on 26 and 27 November 1993 and was filmed on location at Greenwich and the EastEnders Albert Square set situated in the BBC Elstree Centre in Borehamwood, Hertfordshire. It featured all of the surviving actors to have played the Doctor as well as many of the character's companions and several of the EastEnders stars of the time. The special was produced for the Children in Need charity following Doctor Who'''s cancellation in 1989 and was the only serial broadcast in celebration of the show's 30th anniversary.

Plot

The Rani has opened a hole in time, allowing her access to the Doctor's timeline. She uses this to cycle through the Doctor's lives, causing him and his companions to jump back and forth between past and present incarnations. Her intention is to capture all of the Doctor's selves in a time loop, trapping him in the East End of London; she has already captured the First and Second Doctors in the time hole. This causes the Fourth Doctor to send a message to his remaining selves, warning them of the Rani's plan:

The Seventh Doctor and Ace are confused when the TARDIS lands in Greenwich, near the Cutty Sark, thanks to the Rani's attack on the TARDIS. The Doctor finds a newspaper showing the year to be 1973, but before he can make any more conclusions, the Rani causes time to jump. Ace finds herself in Albert Square in 1993 with the Sixth Doctor. Local resident Sanjay tries to sell Ace some new clothes from his stall, and when his wife Gita tells the Sixth Doctor that it is going to be all the rage in 1994, the Rani jumps time again.

The Third Doctor and Mel Bush appear from the time jump, and question an older Pauline Fowler and Kathy Beale on when they are. When Pauline and Kathy reply that it is 2013, another time jump occurs. In 1973, Pauline and Kathy remember the assassination of John F. Kennedy, while Kathy tells off a young Ian Beale. The Sixth Doctor and Susan Foreman appear, but she wonders what has happened to the First Doctor.

After another time jump to 2013, Susan changes into Sarah Jane Smith and the Doctor changes from the Sixth to the Third Doctor. They start to piece together what is happening to them, but the Rani releases her menagerie of specimens, including a Cyberman, Fifi (from The Happiness Patrol), a Sea Devil, an Ogron and a Time Lord from Gallifrey in the next time jump. In 1993, the Fifth Doctor, Nyssa and Peri are attacked by the Rani's menagerie, and after they tried to warn Pat Butcher of the danger, the Rani stops them outside the Queen Vic.

In 1993, after the Fifth Doctor changed to the Third Doctor in the next time jump, with Liz Shaw, the Rani took control of Liz's mind. As Mandy Salter tries to stop the Rani, Captain Mike Yates of UNIT comes in Bessie to save the Third Doctor and get him to the Brigadier who is waiting for them.

After another time jump, the Doctor changed to the Sixth Doctor and after he says goodbye to the Brigadier time jumps again. In 1993, at the Arches, Phil and Grant Mitchell find Romana looking for the Doctor, but they point her to Dr. Harold Legg. As Romana walks past the Queen Vic, the Rani captures her in front of Frank Butcher.

Back in 1973, the Third Doctor explains to Victoria who the Rani was and thinks that her control is breaking down, as they return to the TARDIS.

After the Seventh Doctor lands the TARDIS in 1993, Leela escapes from the Rani, after being cloned in the form of Romana. This results in an additional Time Lord brain imprint being left on the computer inside the Rani's TARDIS instead of the human one she needed, which gives the Seventh Doctor, Ace, and K9 the edge needed to rig up a device to overload it, sending the Rani into the time tunnel where she had trapped the First and Second Doctors and freeing the Doctors' other selves from the loop. As the Seventh Doctor and Ace leave in the TARDIS, the Doctor observes "Certainly, I – I mean, we – are difficult to get rid of."

Continuity
The array of aliens summoned to Walford by the Rani included: an Aldeberian (Zog), an Argolin, a biomechanoid dragon, a Cyberman, a Mawdryn mutant, a Mentor, a Mogarian, an Ogron, a Plasmaton, the Sandminer robot D84, a Sea Devil, a Stigorax (Fifi), a Tetrap, a Time Lord, a Tractator, a Vanir and a Vervoid.

Production

Cast notes

This was the final official appearance of Jon Pertwee as the Third Doctor; Pertwee died three years later. 
Tom Baker returned to the role of the Fourth Doctor on television for the first time since leaving it 12 years previously, though he had recorded links for the video release of the incomplete Shada the year before. Baker would later return to the series in 2013's "The Day of the Doctor" in which he appears as "The Curator".
This special marks the first time that Peter Davison returned as the Fifth Doctor, nine years since he stepped down from the role after filming "The Caves of Androzani". He would later reprise the role again in the 2007 minisode broadcast for Children in Need, "Time Crash", alongside his future son-in-law David Tennant as the Tenth Doctor. He would later reprise the role again in 2022.
It was the final appearance of Colin Baker as the Sixth Doctor until 2022, when he appeared as a “vestige of consciousness” to the Thirteenth Doctor.  
This is the last appearance on television of Caroline John as Liz Shaw (John died in 2012) and Deborah Watling as Victoria Waterfield (Watling died in 2017).
In February 1993, Sophie Aldred had guest-starred in a two-episode arc on EastEnders as Suzi. She appears in Dimensions in Time as Ace, her character from Doctor Who and the final companion of the classic era. The character would not appear on television again until 2022, although Ace would appear in a YouTube video on the official Doctor Who YouTube channel made to promote the Blu-ray re-release of Season 26.
This marked the only time in which the Brigadier appeared together with the Sixth Doctor on screen; they did also meet in the Big Finish audio drama "The Spectre of Lanyon Moor".
This marked, to date, the final on-screen appearances of Carole Ann Ford as Susan Foreman, Nicola Bryant as Peri Brown, Sarah Sutton as Nyssa, Lalla Ward as Romana and Louise Jameson as Leela. This was also the last full appearance of Bonnie Langford as Melanie Bush, although she would cameo at the end of The Power of the Doctor.
This marked the final appearance of Kate O'Mara as The Rani. O'Mara died in 2014.
Samuel West would later play the renegade Time Lord Morbius in the Big Finish audio drama "The Vengeance of Morbius"The Dimensions of Time and 3-Dimensions of Time were the working titles for this story. David Roden managed to convince producer John Nathan-Turner not to use either title, and instead settled on Dimensions in Time. 
This was David Roden's first professional script. Roden's original draft featured the Seventh Doctor meeting the Brigadier en route to a UNIT reunion – and becoming involved in a battle with a crashed spaceship full of Cybermen. The script was entitled Destination: Holocaust, and featured the Seventh Doctor and Brigadier trapped in a burning church, trying to fight off the advancing damaged Cybermen. This original idea, written by David Roden, was vetoed by Nathan-Turner after it became apparent that Children in Need wished for the story to be a crossover with EastEnders. Despite loving the originally proposed script, Nathan-Turner also had concerns about the cost, which would have included several lengthy night-shoots and a much larger special effects budget.

 Allegedly, Anthony Ainley was approached by Nathan-Turner to play the part of the Master in this short story, but he turned it down. Ainley, however, vehemently denied this, insisting that if he were asked, he would have had no hesitation in appearing.  Michael Gough was later approached to re-create the role of the Celestial Toymaker, and again Nathan-Turner was turned down. Finally, Kate O'Mara was asked if she would like to reprise her role of the Rani – a request to which she readily agreed. O'Mara was joined by Samuel West, who played her sidekick Cyrian (named after the original intended actor, Sir Ian McKellen).
The special was one of several special 3D programmes the BBC produced at the time, using a 3D system developed by American inventor Terry D. Beard that made use of the Pulfrich effect. The technology required spectacles with one darkened lens and one transparent one; these were sold in shops to the public, with the proceeds going to Children in Need.
The Daleks were also supposed to appear, but the segment was pulled after a dispute with Dalek creator Terry Nation over payments. The Dalek segment would have seen Peter Davison facing up against them again in the streets seen in the 1984 serial Resurrection of the Daleks.
All actors and crew gave their services especially for Children in Need, and waived their fees on the condition that Dimensions in Time would never be repeated or sold on home video for profit. For the same reason, the story has and never will appear as an extra on a DVD release.
David Roden worked for the BBC Drama Department in London on the 'Writers Academy' training new writers. During 2007 and 2008 he worked for the BBC Wales Drama Department in Script Development alongside the production team for Season 4 of Russell T Davies' new Doctor Who. He contributed a short story to the 'Doctor Who' novel 'The Story of Martha' (2008). Roden also wrote the Doctor Who BBC Audio Exclusive The Nemonite Invasion (2009), which was read by Catherine Tate. Roden has been a script editor for the BBC, most recently on Casualty, and on ITV for Coronation Street.

Broadcast
 Part One was broadcast as part of the 1993 Children in Need telethon. It was introduced by Noel Edmonds in a short live sketch with Jon Pertwee, in character as the Third Doctor.
 At the end of Part One, viewers were asked to phone in and vote for which EastEnders character would save the Doctor at the start of Part Two. Two versions of the scene were filmed, one featuring Mandy and the non-speaking character Sylvia Weng-Chung and the other featuring Big Ron. The £101,000 raised from phone calls went to Children in Need. The result of the vote was announced prior to the screening of Part Two. The version featuring Mandy was broadcast after it won 56% of the vote.
 Part Two was broadcast as part of popular UK programme Noel's House Party.

RatingsDimensions in Time achieved viewing figures of 13.8 million viewers for the first part and 13.6 million for the second part, making them two of the most highly watched episodes of Doctor Who ever produced. The highest single audience figure was for Part Four of City of Death'', at 16.1 million viewers.

References

External links
Doctor Who Scripts Project page for Dimensions in Time

Doctor Who World episode guide entry for Dimensions in Time
Title music
Toby Hadoke’s Who’s Round - David Roden - interview with writer

Doctor Who crossovers
Doctor Who multi-Doctor stories
Doctor Who spin-offs
EastEnders spin-offs
Third Doctor stories
Fourth Doctor stories
Fifth Doctor stories
Sixth Doctor stories
Seventh Doctor stories
The Rani (Doctor Who) stories
Doctor Who charity episodes
Children in Need
1993 British television episodes
Doctor Who stories set on Earth
3D television shows
Anniversary television episodes
Crossover television
Fiction set in 1973
Fiction set in 1993
Fiction set in 2013
Television episodes written by John Nathan-Turner
Television shows shot at BBC Elstree Centre
Time loop television episodes